The year 619 BC was a year of the pre-Julian Roman calendar. In the Roman Empire, it was known as year 135 Ab urbe condita . The denomination 619 BC for this year has been used since the early medieval period, when the Anno Domini calendar era became the prevalent method in Europe for naming years.

Events
 Sadyattes dies and is succeeded as king of Lydia by his son Alyattes.

Births

Deaths
 Sadyattes, king of Lydia
 King Xiang of Zhou, king of the Zhou Dynasty of China

References